Burning Bridges is the fifth album by American singer-guitarist Glen Campbell, released in 1967 by Capitol Records.

Track listing
Side 1
 "Burning Bridges" (Walter Scott) – 2:28
 "Just to Satisfy You" (Waylon Jennings, Don Bowman) – 2:25
 "Summer, Winter, Spring and Fall" (Roy Drusky, Julie McAlpine) – 2:29
 "I'll Hold You in My Heart" (Eddy Arnold, Hall Horton, Tommy Dilbeck) – 2:25
 "As Far As I'm Concerned" (Dale Parker) – 2:13
 "Less of Me" (Glen Campbell) – 2:35

Side 2
 "You've Still Got a Place in My Heart" (Leon Payne) – 2:28
 "Too Late to Worry, Too Blue to Cry" (Al Dexter) – 2:30
 "Old Memories Never Die" (Clyde Pitts, Carl Belew) – 2:16
 "Faith" (Joe Johnson, Dick Glasser) – 2:04
 "Together Again" (Buck Owens) – 2:17

Personnel
Music
 Glen Campbell – vocals, acoustic guitar
 Al Casey – acoustic guitar
 Hal Blaine – drums
 Pete Jolly – piano
 Dennis Budimir – acoustic guitar
 Roy Caton – drums
 Larry Knechtel – piano
 Uncredited - bass

Production
 Al De Lory – producer
 Steve Douglas – producer
 Nick Venet – producer
 Leon Russell – arranger
 Ed Simpson/Capitol Photo Studio – photography

Charts
Album – Billboard (United States)
Burning Bridges did not chart.

Singles – Billboard (United States)

References

Glen Campbell albums
1967 albums
Capitol Records albums
Albums arranged by Leon Russell
Albums produced by Nick Venet
Albums recorded at Capitol Studios